Aurelio Luini (c. 1530–1593) was an Italian painter and draughtsman from Milan, the fourth and last son of Bernardino Luini. A representative of late Lombard Mannerism, he was a friend of Gian Paolo Lomazzo.

Together with his brother Giovan Pietro, also a painter, he frescoed the Bergamini chapel in San Maurizio al Monastero Maggiore in Milan (1555).  

Other works by him include a Lamentation in San Barnaba, frescoes in Santa Maria di Campagna at Pallanza, near Lake Maggiore (together with Carlo Urbino), frescoes for San Vincenzo alle Monache (now in the Pinacoteca di Brera), a Saint Tecla for the Milan Cathedral and a Madonna between SS. Roch and Sebastian for Tortona cathedral.

References

1530s births
1590s deaths
Italian draughtsmen
16th-century Italian painters
Italian male painters
Painters from Milan
Mannerist painters